Tapton School is a secondary school with academy status located in Crosspool, in Sheffield, South Yorkshire, England. It is sited next to another secondary, King Edward VII School in Sheffield, and near to Lydgate Junior School in Crosspool, Lydgate Infant School in Sheffield and Notre Dame Catholic High School in Sheffield.  Tapton School has approximately 1,650 pupils, aged between 11 and 18 years old. Tapton officially opened in 1960, but in 2000 the school was rebuilt under the Private Finance Initiative. Students and faculties officially moved to the new building in September 2001.

History

Tapton Secondary School opened in 1960 with 660 pupils. The pupils came from three local schools who lost their senior school to provide the pupils. These three schools, Springfield County, Nethergreen, and Crookes Endowed, became Junior schools.

The original 1950s school was knocked down and replaced by new premises under the private Finance Initiative in 2001 and is rented from its landlords, Interserve PLC.

After April 2011 the school was affected by changes in the funding of 6th formers and the discontinuation of the specialist schools programme. As a result of this funding change, Tapton governors sought academy status, which was approved, the changeover date being August 2011.

School site
New buildings include 15 science laboratories, a technology block with 10 classrooms, a music block with dedicated practice rooms, a drama studio, and a gym and sports hall. Outside, there is also a floodlit astroturf and tennis court, used by local organisations and other schools for a range of sports. In October 2015, a new building opened, with 4 new geography classrooms and a dance studio which is often used as an assembly hall.

Recognition
Academically, Tapton is one of the most successful state-funded schools in Sheffield. Results at A level and GCSE are consistently above the National average. In the academic year 2009–10, GCSE results placed Tapton 1st in the whole city and A level results were equally good. The Times best schools list 2007 puts the school around 200th in the country, second in Sheffield, though results at GCSE and A level in 2007 would put Tapton first.

The school was inspected by Ofsted on 29 January 2007 and rated as "outstanding".

School students have attained places on the Prime Minister's Global Fellowship programme. The school achieved its first student in the inaugural year of the programme, 2008, and in 2009 had another successful applicant.

Tapton Youth Brass Band
Tapton Youth Brass Band' is a brass band formed in 1994 as the Tapton School band.

Notable former pupils

 Kate Bottley, Anglican priest, TV personality, and journalist
 Sebastian Coe, British politician, former athlete, former head of the British Olympic Association
 Matt Fitzpatrick, golfer, winner of the 2022 U.S. Open
 Philip Hensher, novelist and critic
Adam Johnson, cricketer
 Becky Lyne, athlete
 Richard McCourt, better known as Dick from Dick and Dom
 David James Richards, Silicon Valley entrepreneur and technology executive
 Rick Savage, Pete Willis and Tony Kenning, three of the founding members of Def Leppard
  Charlie Webster, sports TV presenter
 Dr James Whitworth, cartoonist (Sheffield Star, Sheffield Telegraph, Private Eye), academic and writer (DCI Miller novels & journalism)
 John Woodcock, Baron Walney, former Labour MP  
 James Woods, freeskier

References

External links
Tapton School Official Website

Educational institutions established in 1960
Secondary schools in Sheffield
Academies in Sheffield
1960 establishments in England